The 2014 Rogers Cup presented by National Bank was a tennis tournament played on outdoor hard courts. It was the 125th edition (for the men) and the 113th (for the women) of the Canadian Open, and was part of the ATP World Tour Masters 1000 of the 2014 ATP World Tour, and of the WTA Premier 5 tournaments of the 2014 WTA Tour. The men's event was held at the Rexall Centre in Toronto, from August 2 to August 10 and the women's event at the Uniprix Stadium in Montreal, from August 2 to August 10, 2014.

Points and prize money

Point distribution

Prize money

ATP singles main-draw entrants

Seeds

 1Rankings are as of July 28, 2014

Other entrants
The following players received wild cards into the main singles draw:
  Frank Dancevic
  Nick Kyrgios
  Peter Polansky
  Jack Sock

The following player received entry as a special exempt:
  Donald Young

The following players received entry from the singles qualifying draw:
  Tobias Kamke
  Thanasi Kokkinakis
  Benoît Paire
  Michael Russell
  Brayden Schnur
  Tim Smyczek
  Bernard Tomic

The following player received entry as a lucky loser:
  Malek Jaziri
  Marinko Matosevic

Withdrawals
Before the tournament
  Nicolás Almagro (foot injury) → replaced by  Édouard Roger-Vasselin
  Carlos Berlocq → replaced by  Alejandro Falla
  Juan Martín del Potro (wrist injury) → replaced by  Denis Istomin
  Alexandr Dolgopolov (knee injury) → replaced by  Julien Benneteau
  Tommy Haas (shoulder injury) → replaced by  Lleyton Hewitt
  Florian Mayer (groin injury) → replaced by  Lu Yen-hsun
  Rafael Nadal (wrist injury) → replaced by  Jürgen Melzer
  Kei Nishikori (right foot injury) → replaced by  Malek Jaziri
  Dmitry Tursunov → replaced by  Nicolas Mahut
  Fernando Verdasco → replaced by  Dominic Thiem

During the tournament
  Richard Gasquet

ATP doubles main-draw entrants

Seeds

 Rankings are as of July 28, 2014

Other entrants
The following pairs received wildcards into the doubles main draw:
  Frank Dancevic /  Adil Shamasdin
  Vasek Pospisil /  Jack Sock

Withdrawals
Before the tournament
  Vasek Pospisil (right leg injury)

During the tournament
  Richard Gasquet

WTA singles main-draw entrants

Seeds

 1 Rankings are as of July 28, 2014

Other entrants
The following players received wild cards into the main singles draw:
  Françoise Abanda
  Ajla Tomljanović
  Aleksandra Wozniak

The following player used protected ranking to gain entry into the singles main draw:
  Romina Oprandi

The following players received entry from the singles qualifying draw:
  Timea Bacsinszky
  Kiki Bertens
  Lauren Davis
  Stéphanie Dubois
  Karin Knapp
  Monica Puig
  Yulia Putintseva
  Shelby Rogers
  Tereza Smitková
  CoCo Vandeweghe
  Heather Watson
  Yanina Wickmayer

The following players received entry as lucky losers:
  Karolína Plíšková
  Elena Vesnina

Withdrawals
Before the tournament
  Li Na (knee injury) → replaced by  Alison Riske
  Yvonne Meusburger → replaced by  Barbora Záhlavová-Strýcová
  Andrea Petkovic (viral illness) → replaced by  Elena Vesnina
  Vera Zvonareva → replaced by  Karolína Plíšková

Retirements
  Svetlana Kuznetsova (personal reasons)

WTA doubles main-draw entrants

Seeds

 Rankings are as of July 28, 2014

Other entrants
The following pairs received wildcards into the doubles main draw:
  Françoise Abanda /  Stéphanie Dubois
  Gabriela Dabrowski /  Shahar Pe'er
  Kirsten Flipkens /  Petra Kvitová
The following pair received entry as alternates:
  Darija Jurak /  Megan Moulton-Levy

Withdrawals
Before the tournament
  Andrea Petkovic (viral illness)

Finals

Men's singles

  Jo-Wilfried Tsonga defeated  Roger Federer, 7–5, 7–6(7–3)

Women's singles

  Agnieszka Radwańska defeated  Venus Williams, 6–4, 6–2

Men's doubles

  Alexander Peya /  Bruno Soares defeated  Ivan Dodig /  Marcelo Melo, 6–4, 6–3

Women's doubles

  Sara Errani /  Roberta Vinci defeated  Cara Black /  Sania Mirza, 7–6(7–4), 6–3

References

External links
Official website

 
2014 ATP World Tour
2014 WTA Tour
2014 in Canadian sports
2014
August 2014 sports events in Canada